The Crimson Tide Sports Network (sometimes stylized as the CTSN) is the radio and television network of the University of Alabama Crimson Tide men's and women's sports teams. It consists of four television stations, two regional cable networks, and several radio stations throughout the state of Alabama, some of which serves small parts of surrounding states. This organization's headquarters are located in Tuscaloosa, Alabama.

It is operated through a joint venture between IMG College and Learfield Communications.

Programming

Coach’s shows

Television
Crimson Tide This Week
The Nick Saban TV Show

Radio
Crimson Tide Today
The Nick Saban Show
Hey, Coach

Over the air television stations

Regional cable networks

Station list

Asterisk (*) indicates HD Radio broadcast.
Gray background indicates low-power FM translator.

Satellite Radio
In a partnership with CTSN, SiriusXM simulcasts all Alabama football games and various other sports on their regional play-by-play channels: 190, 191 and 192.

References

External links
 Official website of the University of Alabama Athletic Department

  

Alabama Crimson Tide
College football on the radio
College basketball on the radio in the United States
University of Alabama
Sports radio networks in the United States
Learfield IMG College sports radio networks